Atlético Barrio Frigorífico is a Peruvian football club, playing in the city of Callao, Peru.

History
The club have played at the highest level of Peruvian football in the 1974 Torneo Descentralizado, but was relegated the same year. 

In the 2007 Copa Perú, the club classified to the Regional Stage, but was eliminated by Cooperativa Bolognesi of Barranco.

Honours

Regional
Liga Provincial del Callao:
Winners (3): 1965, 1968, 1973
Runner-up (2): 1966, 1967

Liga Distrital del Callao:
Runner-up (2): 1999, 2006

See also
List of football clubs in Peru
Peruvian football league system

References

External links
Peru - Copa Perú 1974
Región 4: Lima y Callao

Football clubs in Peru